The National Institute for Astrophysics (or INAF) is an Italian research institute in astronomy and astrophysics, founded in 1999. INAF funds and operates twenty separate research facilities, which in turn employ scientists, engineers and technical staff. The research they perform covers most areas of astronomy, ranging from planetary science to cosmology.

Research facilities 

INAF coordinates the activities of twenty research units, nineteen in Italy and one in Spain:
Bologna Observatory
Istituto di Astrofisica Spaziale e Fisica cosmica di Bologna
Istituto di Radioastronomia di Bologna
Cagliari Observatory
Catania Observatory
Arcetri Observatory (Florence)
Brera Observatory (Milan)
Istituto di Astrofisica Spaziale e Fisica cosmica di Milano
Capodimonte Observatory (Naples)
Osservatorio Astronomico di Padova
Palermo Observatory
Istituto di Astrofisica Spaziale e Fisica cosmica di Palermo
Rome Observatory
Istituto di Astrofisica Spaziale e Fisica cosmica di Roma
Istituto di Fisica dello Spazio Interplanetario di Roma
Collurania-Teramo Observatory
Turin Observatory
Istituto di Fisica dello Spazio Interplanetario di Torino
Trieste Observatory
Telescopio Nazionale Galileo (Canary Islands, Spain)
Sardinia Radio Telescope (San Basilio, Sardinia)
Noto Radio Observatory (Noto, Sicily)

International partnerships 

INAF is involved in scientific collaborations with several international institutions, including:
the European Southern Observatory (Italy has been an ESO member since 1982)
the astronomical observatories located in Canary Islands (Teide Observatory and Roque de los Muchachos Observatory)
the Large Binocular Telescope, in partnership with the United States and Germany
the Very Long Baseline Interferometry consortium
the European Space Agency (ESA)
the American National Aeronautic and Space Administration (NASA)

Notable figures 
Giampaolo Vettolani, scientific director
Stefano Cristiani, board member
Nicolò D'Amico, president in 2015-2020

Projects

Projects include:
Mars Multispectral Imager for Subsurface Studies, instrument for the ExoMars rover Rosalind Franklin 
Rapid Eye Mount telescope (REM)
Juno's JIRAM

See also 
Istituto Nazionale di Fisica Nucleare (INFN)
French National Centre for Scientific Research (CNRS)

References

External links 
Official website of INAF
Public and press website of INAF
Website of the Italian Telescopio Nazione Galileo
Website of the Large Binocular Telescope (Arizona, US)
Italian Astronomical Archive Center
VObs.it: Italian Virtual Observatory 

Research institutes in Italy
Astrophysics institutes
Rome Q. XV Della Vittoria
1999 establishments in Italy